Issoufou Boubacar Garba (born 2 February 1990) is a retired Nigerien footballer. He played national football for his country.

Career
Garba played for Muangthong United F.C. in the Thai Premier League in 2011.

On July 13, 2012, Garba signed a four-year contract with Tunisian side Club Africain.

Honours
'''Champions Niger Premier League: 2010

International goals

References

1990 births
Living people
People from Niamey
Association football midfielders
Nigerien footballers
Niger international footballers
2012 Africa Cup of Nations players
2013 Africa Cup of Nations players
AS FAN players
Rail Club du Kadiogo players
Issoufou Boubacar Garba
Issoufou Boubacar Garba
Club Africain players
Olympic FC de Niamey players
CS Hammam-Lif players
Stade Tunisien players
Young Africans S.C. players
Nigerien expatriate footballers
Expatriate footballers in Burkina Faso
Expatriate footballers in Thailand
Expatriate footballers in Tunisia
Expatriate footballers in Tanzania
Nigerien expatriate sportspeople in Burkina Faso
Nigerien expatriate sportspeople in Thailand
Nigerien expatriate sportspeople in Tunisia
Nigerien expatriate sportspeople in Tanzania
Tunisian Ligue Professionnelle 1 players
Tanzanian Premier League players